Between the Trees was an American rock band from Orlando, Florida, formed in 2005. The band consisted of vocalist/guitarist Ryan Kirkland, lead guitarist Brad Kriebel, drummer Josh Butler and bassist Jeremy Butler.

Between the Trees released their debut album through Bonded Records in 2006, entitled The Story and the Song. In 2007, they signed to The Universal Motown/Universal Republic Group, but it was later announced that the band/label relationship had fallen through, and their next album was to be self-released. Their second album was entitled Spain and was released on August 11, 2009.

History

Formation and The Story and the Song (2005–2006)
Formed in early 2005, in the east side of Orlando, Florida, Between the Trees began with lead vocalist Ryan Kirkland and brothers Josh and Jeremy Butler. Not long after, in Spring of 2005, they chose a keyboardist, Wes Anderson, Realizing a need for another guitarist, the band soon recruited Brad Kriebel, who was a close friend. After finalizing the line up, they began to write and collaborate different styles of music.

After graduating from their respective high schools, Between the Trees released their first album, The Story and the Song, on September 19, 2006, through the independent label Bonded Records. The band's first single was "The Way She Feels", with the music video first being released on May 14, 2006.  The song first received radio airplay in the United States on May 27, 2007.

Between the Trees was involved with the non-profit organization To Write Love on Her Arms, which is dedicated to providing help to those who struggle with depression, addiction, self-injury, and suicide. Two songs on their first album are based upon the organization, and the subsequent problems that it hopes to solve. The band's debut record also covered various other elements, featuring themes of romance, introspection, relationships, and even a song about the band's fans (opener "The Forward").

Record labels and Spain (2007–present)
In early August 2007, the band announced via their MySpace, that they had signed with record label Universal Motown Republic. The announcement came two weeks after their appearance on the Vans Warped Tour. Prior to the release of their second album, the band's bassist Jeremy Butler stated on AbsolutePunk.net that Between the Trees had parted ways with the label and had decided to distribute the record themselves.

In August 2008, Brad Kriebel and the band parted ways due to creative differences. They temporarily replaced him with lead guitarist Josh Jove. Also, on June 3, 2009 the band announced the departure of Wes Anderson. His desire to venture in a different direction was stated as his reason of departure.

Between the Trees announced the confirmed release of their second album, entitled Spain, which was released on August 11, 2009. The first single off the album is "We Can Try", with a music video being officially released on August 28, 2009.

Between the Trees released the Winter EP, their first EP at the moment. It was only available on dates of their Winter 09' shows. But they have said that at some point it will be available for purchase online, until then the songs are available on YouTube.
On September 8, 2010 Between The Trees announced that by the end of the year, they will disband.

"It is with regret that I announce that Between The Trees will be disbanding by the end of this year. It's not a decision that we all fully agree with, but it's a decision that is final."

The band also announced that their long-time touring guitarist Stevie Benz would be joining the band as an official member.

On December 23, 2011, Ryan Kirkland released "You Showed Up" for his church's Christmas theme.

Farewell Shows
The band performed two farewell shows at "The Social" in downtown Orlando, FL on December 6 and 7, 2010. Aaron Gillespie (of The Almost) performed as an opening act.

Band members

Former 
 Ryan Kirkland – Guitar, lead vocals, keyboards
 Josh Butler – Drums
 Jeremy Butler – Bass guitar
 Andrew Kelly - Guitar, vocals
 Stevie Benz – Guitar, background vocals (currently in The Rocket Summer)
 Brad Kriebel – Guitar
 Wes Anderson – Keyboards, Percussion

Touring Musicians 
 Josh Jove – (former) Guitar, background vocals
 Jordan Ensminger – (former) Guitar, background vocals

Discography

Studio albums 
 2006: The Story and the Song
 2009: Spain U.S. No. 138

Extended play 
 2009: Winter EP

References

External links 

Betweenthetrees.net Official website
Between the Trees at Purevolume
Between the Trees at MySpace

Alternative rock groups from Florida
Christian rock groups from Florida
Pop punk groups from Florida
Indie rock musical groups from Florida
Musical groups established in 2005
Musical groups disestablished in 2010
Musical groups from Orlando, Florida
Universal Motown Records artists